North Dakota Highway 4 (ND 4) is a  north–south state highway in northern North Dakota, connecting U.S. Route 281 (US 281) and ND 5 near Rocklake to Manitoba Highway 5 at the Canada–US border.

Route description
ND 4 begins at a four-way intersection with concurrent highways US 281 and ND 5 along a roadway named 61st Avenue. The highway continues north through sparsely populated Armourdale as a two-lane undivided highway intersecting County Route 4 in Hansboro before turning east at 108th Street and then returning to a northerly direction until its end at the Canada–US border.

History

This route was known as Highway 69 until 1997, possibly due to the sexual connotation of the number.

Major intersections

References

004
Transportation in Towner County, North Dakota